Astoria High School may refer to:

Astoria High School (Illinois), Astoria, Illinois
Astoria High School (Oregon), Astoria, Oregon